Christoph Waltz is an Austrian-German actor and director. He was born in October, 1956.

Filmography

Film

Television

As director

References 

Male actor filmographies
Director filmographies